Roland Fabien Berrill (1897–1962) was a British-Australian who was the co-founder (with the English barrister Lancelot Ware) of Mensa, the international society for intellectually gifted people.

The founding of Mensa
Mensa was founded by Berrill and Lancelot Ware at Lincoln College, Oxford, England on 1 October 1946. They originally called it the "High IQ Club". Lance Ware had the initial idea for the society, but Berrill founded Mensa in the usual sense: he supplied the start-up cash, wrote some initial idiosyncratic pamphlets and became Mensa's first Secretary.

Berrill was an unashamed elitist, who regretted the passing of an aristocratic tradition. He regarded Mensa as "an aristocracy of the intellect". He noticed with some disappointment that a majority of Mensans appeared to have come from humble homes.

At an early Mensa organizational meeting, one of the people present proposed that black people be excluded from Mensa. This was met by shocked silence. Then Berrill proposed that the motion be amended to exclude "green people with yellow stripes" instead. This amended motion passed, with one vote against.  If the minutes of that meeting had not been lost, that statute might still be on the books of Mensa.

Berrill died a few years later, having recruited in total around 400 people by self-administered IQ tests.

Personal life
Berrill was born in Australia in 1897, but left with his family in 1901 and went to London. Although he was called to the bar, he never practised as a barrister but lived on the dividends of his investments.

He spent most of the rest of his life in England. He had brief trips to Tangier in 1936, New York City in 1937 and Durban, South Africa in 1959. On 22 November 1948 he spoke at the Socratic Club at Oxford, combining with Father Victor White, on the topic "Beyond Myth and Dogma" at Lady Margaret Hall in the University of Oxford.

Berrill was thick-set and sturdy, with a full dark beard and moustache.  He believed in palmistry, phrenology, astrology and dianetics. These views were not popular within Mensa, and he was regarded by Mensans as "deficient in normal scepticism".

Berrill was a member of the men's dress reform movement; he desired more colour in men's clothes, and objected to the uniformity common in those days.  He never married.

References 

1897 births
1962 deaths
Australian barristers
Australian emigrants to the United Kingdom
Mensans
Date of birth missing
Date of death missing